Mathieu Doby (born 3 May 1982 in Grenoble, France) is a French-born Belgian slalom canoeist who has competed at the international level since 2004, representing France. He has represented Belgium since 2007.

At the 2012 Summer Olympics he competed in the K1 event where he finished in 11th place after being eliminated in the semifinals.

World Cup individual podiums

References

External links

Belgian male canoeists
1982 births
Living people
Olympic canoeists of Belgium
Canoeists at the 2012 Summer Olympics